James Brian Dick (born June 18, 1964) is an American football linebacker who played in the National Football League (NFL) for the Minnesota Vikings in 1987. Born in Great Lakes, Illinois, he attended Totino-Grace High School in Fridley, Minnesota, and played college football for North Dakota State. He was picked up by the Vikings as one of their replacement players during the 1987 NFL strike, and played in three games, starting two of them.

In 1996 Dick was charged but ultimately cleared for theft in a case which saw his parents convicted.

References

External links
Profile at Pro-Football-Reference.com

1964 births
Living people
People from Great Lakes, Illinois
American football linebackers
North Dakota State Bison football players
Minnesota Vikings players